Wash was a possible pharaoh from the Predynastic Period. His existence is disputed; if he existed, he is attested to only by his presence on the Narmer Palette, which presumably depicts his defeat.

Background
Whether or not Wash existed is uncertain – the only possible attestation of his existence lies on the Narmer Palette, found in Hierakonpolis. The recto of the Palette depicts a kneeling captive, "un-Egyptian in appearance", about to be smitten by Narmer. The hieroglyphs carved near the captive – a harpoon and a lake – have been considered by scholars to be either a location name for the Harpoon nome (located in the Northwestern Nile Delta next to the Libyan borders) or the personal name of the captive, phonetically read as Washi or Wash.

Assuming that the latter identification is correct, and that Wash was a historical figure, it has been speculated that he may have been the last ruler of a Lower Egyptian dynasty based at Buto, who was ultimately defeated by the Upper Egyptian leader, Narmer. However, it is possible that the Narmer Palette depicts an allegory rather than a historical event, with Wash merely being part of that construct.

Archaeologist Edwin van den Brink argued that Hedju Hor – another predynastic Lower Egyptian ruler – could be identified with Wash, on the basis of the similarities between the former's serekh and the carving above Wash on the Narmer Palette.

References 

32nd-century BC Pharaohs
31st-century BC Pharaohs
People whose existence is disputed